Otto II ( – 27 March 1428) was a Duke of Pomerania-Stettin from the House of Griffins.

Life 
Otto II was the eldest son of Duke Swantibor III, of Pomerania-Stettin and his wife Anna of Hohenzollern.

When Otto was about 20 years old, his father tried to make him the Archbishop of Riga, which, against the will of the Teutonic Knights, who preferred John of Wallenrode as Archbishop.  Otto was confirmed as Archbishop in 1394 by King Wenceslaus and in 1396, he went to Dorpat, where he created an alliance with Grand Duke Vytautas of Lithuania.  In the following years, however, the Teutonic Order prevailed and Otto returned to Pomerania and this episode was without lasting results.

Otto's father, Duke Swantibor III, had been governor of the Mittelmark, a part of Brandenburg since 1409. When Burgrave Frederick VI of Nuremberg, the later Elector Frederick I of Brandenburg, was appointed Margrave of Brandenburg by Emperor Sigismund and Duke Swantibor hun on to his post as governor of the Mittelmark, armed clashes between the two resulted.  Swantibor III retired in 1412 and left government to his two sons Otto II and Casimir V.  They fought the inconclusive Battle of Kremmer Damm against Brandenburg on 12 October 1412.

When Duke Swantibor III died on 21 June 1413, Otto II and Casimir V decided to rule Pomerania-Stettin jointly.  The war with Brandenburg continued.  In 1415, Emperor Sigismund outlawed Otto II and Casimir V, at the request of Frederick I.  On 16 December 1415, the brothers signed a peace treaty with Frederick in Eberswalde.  Pomerania gave up the Uckermark, Boitzenburg and Zehdenick in exchange for monetary compensation.  Nevertheless, the fighting continued, with varying results.  In 1419, Otto II took the city of Prenzlau.  However, in 1420, he suffered a crushing defeat at Angermünde and he lost Prenzlau again.  In 1425, Otto II and Casimir V managed to capture Prenzlau by surprise.  However, they lost it again in 1426.

Brandenburg raised the question of Pomerania's imperial immediacy.  Brandenburg claimed that Pomerania was a fief of Brandenburg; the Duke of Pomerania claimed they were immediately subordinate to the Empire.  In 1417, Emperor Sigismund invested Otto II with Pomerania-Stettin, subject to the rights of Brandenburg; in 1424, Casimir V was invested by the Emperor without such a restriction.

In 1426, Frederick abdicated in favor of his eldest son John.  Later that year, Otto II and Casimir V made peace with John and on 16 June 1427, a peace treaty was signed in Templin between John and all the Dukes of Pomerania.

Otto II died on 27 March 1428. From that date, his brother Casimir V ruled Pomerania-Stettin alone.

Marriage 
Otto II was married to Agnes of Mecklenburg, a daughter of Duke John II of Mecklenburg-Stargard.  They had no children.

Sometimes it is alleged that Otto had earlier married a daughter of Grand Duke Vytautas of Lithuania.  According to the historian Martin Wehrmann, there is no evidence for such a marriage and the rumour is probably based on the alliance between Otto and Vytautas.

Ancestors

See also 
 List of Pomeranian duchies and dukes

References 
 
 Klaus Conrad: Herzogliche Schwäche und städtische Macht in der zweiten Hälfte des 14. und im 15. Jahrhundert, in: Werner Buchholz (ed.): Deutsche Geschichte im Osten Europas. Pommern, Siedler Verlag, Berlin, 1999, p. 127–202

Footnotes 

House of Griffins
Dukes of Pomerania
1380s births
1428 deaths
14th-century German nobility
15th-century German nobility